Orion Pitts (born March 18 1980) is an American voice actor who provides voices for English versions of Japanese anime series. He is known for his anime roles as Hyakunosuke Ogata from Golden Kamuy, Rintaro Kira	from Kenka Bancho Otome: Girl Beats Boys, Akira from Afterlost, Daisuke Hiyama from Arifureta: From Commonplace to World's Strongest, Taichi Nanao from A3!, Jun Sazanami from Ensemble Stars!, and Ranta from Grimgar of Fantasy and Ash. He also voiced Aram from Chain Chronicle, Chihiro Kamina from Lord of Vermilion: The Crimson King and Nozomu Nanashima from Kiss Him, Not Me.

Biography
He started voicing in 1998 and is associated with Funimation.

Filmography

Anime

Film

Web series

Video games

References

External links
 
 

1980 births
Living people
20th-century American male actors
American male voice actors
21st-century American male actors
American male video game actors